Viktor Ivanovich Kosichkin (25 February 1938 – 30 March 2012) was a speed skater who competed for the Soviet Union.

Kosichkin trained at Dynamo. He participated in the 1960 Winter Olympics in Squaw Valley. On the 5000 m, held on his 22nd birthday, he won gold, while the silver medal went to his major rival, Knut Johannesen. On the 10000 m two days later, the roles were reversed, with Johannesen winning gold and Kosichkin silver.

The next year (1961), Kosichkin became Soviet and European Allround Champion, while winning silver at the World Allround Championships (behind Henk van der Grift). In 1962 he was not selected to be on the Soviet team for the European Championships and he damaged his skates in anger. His friend Yevgeny Grishin gave him an old pair of skates and Kosichkin became World Champion on these.

1963 was not a good year for Kosichkin, winning no major medals and finishing only 15th at the Soviet Allround Championships. In 1964, he once more won silver behind Johannesen at the World Allround Championships. He also participated in the 5000 m and the 10000 m at the 1964 Winter Olympics of Innsbruck, but he did not win any medals.

He was Soviet Champion on the 5000 m in 1958, 1960, 1961 and 1962, and on the 10000 m in 1960, 1961, 1962, 1964 and 1965. Kosichkin's highest ranking on the Adelskalender, the all-time allround speed skating ranking, was a third place.

Medals
An overview of medals won by Kosichkin at important championships, listing the years in which he won each:

External links
Viktor Kosichkin at SkateResults.com
Legends of Soviet Sport: Viktor Kosichkin
Viktor Kosichkin's obituary

1938 births
2012 deaths
People from Rybnovsky District
Communist Party of the Soviet Union members
Dynamo sports society athletes
Medalists at the 1960 Winter Olympics
Olympic gold medalists for the Soviet Union
Olympic medalists in speed skating
Olympic silver medalists for the Soviet Union
Olympic speed skaters of the Soviet Union
Speed skaters at the 1960 Winter Olympics
Speed skaters at the 1964 Winter Olympics
World Allround Speed Skating Championships medalists
Honoured Masters of Sport of the USSR
Recipients of the Order of the Red Banner of Labour
Russian male speed skaters
Soviet colonels
Soviet male speed skaters
Burials in Troyekurovskoye Cemetery